Ait Sedrate Jbel El Oulia is a commune in Tinghir Province of the Drâa-Tafilalet administrative region of Morocco. At the time of the 2004 census, the commune had a total population of 4059 people living in 618 households.

References

Populated places in Ouarzazate Province
Rural communes of Drâa-Tafilalet